On 29 January 2021, Algeria launched a COVID-19 vaccination campaign, a day after receiving its first shipment of 50,000 doses of the Russia's Sputnik V vaccine. As of 6 June 2021, around 2.5 million doses have been administered. Algeria is currently vaccinating its population with both Sputnik V and Oxford-AstraZeneca vaccines.

Background

Data Reporting 
Algeria has reported on administering over 2.5 million doses of the vaccine. Data is only reported every few weeks or months apart without secondary dose information.

History

Timeline

January 2021 
On 28 January 2021, Algeria received 50,000 doses of Russia's Sputnik V vaccine which landed at Algiers International Airport.

On 29 January 2021, Algeria launched a coronavirus vaccination campaign, a day after receiving its first shipment of 50,000 doses of Russia's Sputnik V vaccine.

February 2021 
On 1 February, 50,000 doses of the Oxford–AstraZeneca COVID-19 vaccine arrived.

On 25 February 2021, Algeria received 200,000 more vaccines from China.

April 2021 
364,800 doses of the Oxford-AstraZeneca vaccine were delivered on 3 April through the COVAX pillar.

On 7 April, minister Lotfi Benbahmad announced that an agreement had been reached to produce Sputnik V at Saidal's manufacturing plant in Constantine.

On 26 April, the U.S. provided more than 600,000 doses of the Johnson & Johnson COVID-19 vaccine.

August 2021 
By the end of the month, 4.1 million vaccine doses had been administered.

September 2021 
By the end of the month, 10.2 million vaccine doses had been administered.

October 2021 
By the end of the month, 11.2 million vaccine doses had been administered while 27% of the target population had been fully vaccinated.

November 2021 
By the end of the month, 12.1 million vaccine doses had been administered while 30% of the target population had been fully vaccinated.

December 2021 
By the end of the month, 12.5 million vaccine doses had been administered while 31% of the target population had been fully vaccinated.

January 2022 
By the end of the month, 13 million vaccine doses had been administered while 32% of the target population had been fully vaccinated.

April 2022 
By the end of the month, 15 million vaccine doses had been administered while 6.5 million persons had been fully vaccinated.

Progress 
Cumulative vaccinations in Algeria

Daily vaccinations chart of Algeria

References 

Algeria
Vaccination
Algeria